This page summarises the Main Path matches of 2018–19 UEFA Europa League qualifying phase and play-off round.

Times are CEST (UTC+2), as listed by UEFA (local times, if different, are in parentheses).

Preliminary round

Summary

|}

Matches

Prishtina won 6–1 on aggregate.

Gżira United won 4–1 on aggregate.

Engordany won 3–2 on aggregate.

2–2 on aggregate. B36 Tórshavn won 4–2 on penalties.

KÍ Klaksvík won 3–2 on aggregate.

Tre Fiori won 3–1 on aggregate.

Trakai won 2–1 on aggregate.

First qualifying round

Summary

|}
Notes

Matches

Stjarnan won 3–1 on aggregate.

Slavia Sofia won 3–1 on aggregate.

Žalgiris won 3–2 on aggregate.

0–0 on aggregate. Fola Esch won 5–4 on penalties.

Molde won 6–3 on aggregate.

DAC Dunajská Streda won 3–2 on aggregate.

Apollon Limassol won 2–1 on aggregate.

3–3 on aggregate. Domžale won on away goals.

Rangers won 2–0 on aggregate.

Progrès Niederkorn won 2–1 on aggregate.

Viitorul Constanța won 2–0 on aggregate.

Tobol won 3–0 on aggregate.

Maribor won 3–0 on aggregate.

Újpest won 5–3 on aggregate.

Trenčín won 3–1 on aggregate.

Dinamo Minsk won 3–2 on aggregate.

B36 Tórshavn won 2–1 on aggregate.

Górnik Zabrze won 2–1 on aggregate.

Spartak Subotica won 3–1 on aggregate.

Pyunik won 3–0 on aggregate.

AIK won 2–1 on aggregate.

Shakhtyor Soligorsk won 5–1 on aggregate.

FH won 3–0 on aggregate.

Ventspils won 8–3 on aggregate.

Nordsjælland won 3–1 on aggregate.

Sarajevo won 5–1 on aggregate.

Kairat won 10–1 on aggregate

Osijek won 3–2 on aggregate.

2–2 on aggregate. Laçi won on away goals.Maccabi Tel Aviv won 2–1 on aggregate.Balzan won 5–3 on aggregate.Honvéd won 5–2 on aggregate.Partizan won 6–0 on aggregate.1–1 on aggregate. CSKA Sofia won 5–3 on penalties.Slovan Bratislava won 9–2 on aggregate.Radnički Niš won 5–0 on aggregate.Lech Poznań won 3–2 on aggregate.Chikhura Sachkhere won 2–1 on aggregate.3–3 on aggregate. Vaduz won on away goals.Željezničar won 5–1 on aggregate.Trakai won 1–0 on aggregate.Hibernian won 12–5 on aggregate.Rudar Velenje won 10–0 on aggregate.Dundalk won 3–1 on aggregate.Sarpsborg 08 won 6–0 on aggregate.Copenhagen won 2–1 on aggregate.BK Häcken won 4–2 on aggregate.Second qualifying round

Summary

|+Main Path

|}
Notes

MatchesMolde won 5–0 on aggregate.Atalanta won 10–2 on aggregate.Žalgiris won 2–1 on aggregate.Kairat won 3–2 on aggregate.Burnley won 4–2 on aggregate.Partizan won 2–1 on aggregate.Slovan Bratislava won 4–3 on aggregate.Nordsjælland won 2–0 on aggregate.FCSB won 6–0 on aggregate.Hapoel Haifa won 2–1 on aggregate.AEK Larnaca won 4–0 on aggregate.Trenčín won 5–1 on aggregate.Maccabi Tel Aviv won 4–2 on aggregate.CSKA Sofia won 6–1 on aggregate.Spartak Subotica won 3–2 on aggregate.RB Leipzig won 5–1 on aggregate.Copenhagen won 7–0 on aggregate.1–1 on aggregate. Ufa won on away goals.2–2 on aggregate. Pyunik won on away goals.Jagiellonia Białystok won 5–4 on aggregate.LASK won 6–1 on aggregate.Progrès Niederkorn won 2–1 on aggregate.Rangers won 2–1 on aggregate.Beşiktaş won 8–0 on aggregate.Dinamo Minsk won 7–2 on aggregate.Bordeaux won 3–1 on aggregate.Apollon Limassol won 5–2 on aggregate.Vitesse won 5–3 on aggregate.2–2 on aggregate. Sarpsborg 08 won on away goals.Dynamo Brest won 5–4 on aggregate.Sevilla won 7–1 on aggregate.Lech Poznań won 4–2 on aggregate.Hibernian won 4–3 on aggregate.Maribor won 2–0 on aggregate.Genk won 9–1 on aggregate.Mariupol won 3–2 on aggregate.Hajduk Split won 4–2 on aggregate.Third qualifying round
Summary

|+Main Path

|}

MatchesMaccabi Tel Aviv won 2–1 on aggregate.Zenit Saint Petersburg won 8–5 on aggregate.AEK Larnaca won 7–0 on aggregate.Sarpsborg 08 won 2–1 on aggregate.Burnley won 1–0 on aggregate.3–3 on aggregate. Zorya Luhansk won on away goals.Atalanta won 6–1 on aggregate.Genk won 4–1 on aggregate.Basel won 2–0 on aggregate.Partizan won 5–3 on aggregate.Molde won 3–0 on aggregate.FCSB won 2–1 on aggregate.Sevilla won 6–0 on aggregate.Sigma Olomouc won 4–1 on aggregate.Rapid Wien won 5–2 on aggregate.Bordeaux won 5–2 on aggregate.Copenhagen won 4–2 on aggregate.Olympiacos won 7–1 on aggregate.Rangers won 3–1 on aggregate.Trenčín won 5–1 on aggregate.Gent won 4–1 on aggregate.Brøndby won 4–1 on aggregate.Ufa won 4–3 on aggregate.2–2 on aggregate. Beşiktaş won on away goals.Apollon Limassol won 4–1 on aggregate.RB Leipzig won 4–2 on aggregate.Play-off round
Summary

|+Main Path

|}
Notes

MatchesSevilla won 4–0 on aggregate.Sarpsborg 08 won 4–3 on aggregate.Bordeaux won 2–0 on aggregate.Beşiktaş won 4–1 on aggregate.Rapid Wien won 4–3 on aggregate.3–3 on aggregate. Apollon Limassol won on away goals. Rangers won 2–1 on aggregate.0–0 on aggregate. Copenhagen won 4–3 on penalties.Zenit Saint Petersburg won 4–3 on aggregate.AEK Larnaca won 4–1 on aggregate.Genk won 9–4 on aggregate.Olympiacos won 4–2 on aggregate.RB Leipzig won 3–2 on aggregate.''

Notes

References

External links

1M
UEFA Europa League qualifying rounds